Blackpool is a seaside town and unitary authority situated on The Fylde coast in Lancashire, England. This list includes the listed buildings in Blackpool and Bispham, a village within the borough of Blackpool. One is classified by English Heritage as being in Grade I and five in Grade II*. In the United Kingdom, the term "listed building" refers to a building or other structure officially designated as being of special architectural, historical or cultural significance. These buildings are in three grades: Grade I consists of buildings of outstanding architectural or historical interest; Grade II* includes particularly significant buildings of more than local interest; Grade II consists of buildings of special architectural or historical interest. Buildings in England are listed by the Secretary of State for Culture, Media and Sport on recommendations provided by English Heritage, which also determines the grading.

Key

Listed buildings

See also

Listed buildings in Lancashire

References
Notes

Bibliography

External links

 Listed
Blackpool